The TOPIO Dio is a robot designed to serve in a restaurant or coffee shop, or as a cocktail bartender, which is manufactured by Vietnam-based company, Tosy. TOPIO Dio has a 3-wheel moving platform, 28 degrees of freedom and is operated remotely with a built-in camera and an obstacle detector. It is 125 cm high and weighs 45 kg.

Development history

Specifications

Technologies 
 Remote control via wireless internet
 Integrate 3D vision via 2 cameras 
 3D operation space of robot defined by the controlling software
 Processes pre-defined images 
 Detects obstacles by Ultrasonic Sensor 
 Three-wheeled base with omnidirectional and balanced motion

See also 

 TOPIO

References

External links 

  - TOSY
  - TOSY
 Topio Dio serves up drinks at bar - www.ubergizmo.com
 TOPIO Dio: Meet Vietnamese's first service robot - www.crunchgear.com
 TOPIO Dio the skillful waiter bartender - www.slashgear.com
 Meet TOPIO Dio Vietnam's first humanoid bartender - techblips.dailyradar.com

Humanoid robots
Service robots
Robotics at TOSY
2010 robots
Three-wheeled balancing robots